This is a list of golfers who have won 10 or more events on the LPGA of Japan Tour. 

Many of the players on the list have won events on other tours and unofficial events.

This list is up to date as of 5 March 2023.

Source:

See also
List of golfers with most Japan Golf Tour wins

References

External links
LPGA of Japan Tour's official site

Japan
 
LPGA of Japan Tour